Cohousing is an intentional community of private homes clustered around shared space. The term originated in Denmark in late 1960s. Each attached or single family home has traditional amenities, including a private kitchen. Shared spaces typically feature a common house, which may include a large kitchen and dining area, laundry, and recreational spaces. Shared outdoor space may include parking, walkways, open space, and gardens. Neighbors also share resources like tools and lawnmowers.

Households have independent incomes and private lives, but neighbors collaboratively plan and manage community activities and shared spaces. The legal structure is typically a homeowner association or housing cooperative. Community activities feature regularly scheduled shared meals, meetings, and workdays. Neighbors gather for parties, games, movies, or other events. Cohousing makes it easy to form clubs, organize child and elder care, and carpool.

Cohousing facilitates interaction among neighbors and thereby provides social, practical, economic, and environmental benefits.

Characteristics 

Cohousing communities are usually structured – in principle and often in architecture – to encourage frequent interactions and the formation of close relationships among their members. Neighbors are encouraged to cooperate within the community and to care for their neighbors. Cohousing developments are usually intentionally limited to around 20–40 homes and frequently feature large common areas for residents to interact in. While cohousing developments are designed to encourage community, residents usually still have as much personal privacy as they want. Residents are able to choose how much they engage in order to find the right balance between their privacy and the community. Decision making in cohousing communities is often based on forming a consensus within the community. Residents have shared space which they can all use, usually saving money; however, residents can still manage their own space to appeal to them. Cohousing is similar to coliving, distinguished by individual units in Cohousing with personal amenities such as kitchens and bathrooms, while coliving involves the communal use of shared bathrooms and common spaces such as kitchens and living rooms.

Origins
The modern theory of cohousing originated in Denmark in the 1960s among groups of families who were dissatisfied with existing housing and communities that they felt did not meet their needs. Bodil Graae wrote a newspaper article titled "Children Should Have One Hundred Parents", spurring a group of 50 families to organize around a community project in 1967. This group split into two groups who developed the cohousing projects Sættedammen and Skråplanet, which are the oldest known modern cohousing communities. The key organizer was Jan Gudmand Høyer who drew inspiration from his architectural studies at Harvard and interaction with experimental U.S. communities of the era. He published the article "The Missing Link between Utopia and the Dated Single Family House" in 1968, converging a second group.

The Danish term bofællesskab (living community) was introduced to North America as cohousing by two American architects, Kathryn McCamant and Charles Durrett, who visited several cohousing communities and wrote a book about it. The book resonated with some existing and forming communities, such as Sharingwood in Washington state and N Street in California, who embraced the cohousing concept as a crystallization of what they were already about.  Though most cohousing groups seek to develop multi-generational communities, some focus on creating senior communities.  Charles Durrett later wrote a handbook on creating senior cohousing. The first community in the United States to be designed, constructed and occupied specifically for cohousing is Muir Commons in Davis, California.

There are precedents for cohousing in the 1920s in New York with the cooperative apartment housing with shared facilities and good social interaction. The Siheyuan, or quadrangle design of housing in China has a shared courtyard and is thus similar in some respects to cohousing.

Growth
Cohousing communities are part of the new cooperative economy in the United States and are predicted to expand rapidly in the next few decades as individuals and families seek to live more sustainably, and in community with neighbors. Since the first cohousing community was completed in the U.S. – Muir Commons in Davis, California – more than 160 communities have been established in 25 states plus the District of Columbia, with more than 125 in process. Most cohousing communities are intergenerational with both children and elders; in recent years, senior cohousing focused on older adult needs have grown. These communities come in a variety, but are often environment friendly and socially sustainable.

Hundreds of cohousing communities exist in Denmark and other countries in northern Europe. In Canada, there are 17 completed communities, and approximately 42 in the forming, development, or construction phase (see The Canadian Cohousing Network). There are more than 300 cohousing communities in the Netherlands (73 mixed-generation and 231 senior cohousing), with about 60 others in planning or construction phases.
There are also communities in Australia, the United Kingdom, New Zealand and other parts of the world.

Cohousing started to develop in the UK at the end of the 1990s. The movement has gradually built up momentum and there are now 14 purpose built cohousing communities. A further 40+ cohousing groups are developing projects and new groups are forming all the time. Cohousing communities in the UK range from around 8 households to around 30 households. Most communities are mixed communities with single people, couples and families but some are only for people over 50 and one is only for women over 50 years. The communities themselves range from new developments built to modern eco standards to conversions of everything from farms to Jacobean mansions to former hospital buildings and are in urban, rural and semi- rural locations.

Design

Because each cohousing community is planned in its context, following the principles of complementary architecture. A key feature of this model is its flexibility to the needs and values of its residents and the characteristics of the site. Cohousing can be urban, suburban or rural. The physical form is typically compact but varies from low-rise apartments to townhouses to clustered detached houses. They tend to keep cars to the periphery which promotes walking through the community and interacting with neighbors as well as increasing safety for children at play within the community. Shared green space is another characteristic, whether for gardening, play, or places to gather.  When more land is available than is needed for the physical structures, the structures are usually clustered closely together, leaving as much of the land as possible "open" for shared use.  This aspect of cohousing directly addresses the growing problem of suburban sprawl.

In addition to "from-scratch" new-built communities (including those physically retrofitting/re-using existing structures), there are also "retrofit" (aka "organic") communities, in which neighbors create "intentional neighborhoods" by buying adjacent properties and removing fences. Often, they create common amenities such as common houses after the fact while living there. N Street Cohousing in Davis, California, is the canonical example of this type; it came together before the term Cohousing was popularized in the United States.

Cohousing differs from some types of intentional communities in that the residents do not have a shared economy or a common set of beliefs or religion, but instead invest in creating a socially rich and interconnected community. A non-hierarchical structure employing a consensus decision-making model is common in managing cohousing. Individuals do take on leadership roles, such as being responsible for coordinating a garden or facilitating a meeting.

Ownership form
Cohousing communities in the U.S. currently rely on one of two existing legal forms of real estate ownership: individually titled houses with common areas owned by a homeowner association (condominiums) or a housing cooperative. Condo ownership is most common because it fits financial institutions' and cities' models for multi-unit owner-occupied housing development. U.S. banks lend more readily on single-family homes and condominiums than housing cooperatives. Charles Durrett points out that rental cohousing is a very likely future model, as it already is being practiced in Europe. In Australia, due to higher legal complexity of cooperatives, cohousing projects are most commonly developed under limited proprietary company with cooperative-like rules.

Cohousing differs from standard condominium development and master-planned subdivisions because the development is designed by, or with considerable input from, its future residents.  The design process invariably emphasizes consciously fostering social relationships among its residents.  Common facilities are based on the actual needs of the residents, rather than on what a developer thinks will help sell units.  Turnover in cohousing developments is typically very low, and there is usually a waiting list for units to become available.

In Europe the term "joint building ventures" has been coined to define the form of ownership and housing characterized as cohousing. According to the European Urban Knowledge Network (EUKN): "Joint building ventures are a legal federation of persons willing to build who want to create owner-occupied housing and to participate actively in planning and building."

See also

 , aka Baugruppe

References

Further reading
Gresleri, Jacopo. Cohousing. Esperienze internazionali di abitare condiviso, Genova: Plug in, 2015, 
McCamant, Kathryn; Durrett, Charles. Creating Cohousing: Building Sustainable Communities, New Society Publishers, 2011, .
Durrett, Charles. The Senior Cohousing Handbook: A Community Approach to Independent Living", 2nd Ed., New Society Publishers, 2009, .
McCamant, Kathryn; Durrett, Charles. Cohousing: A Contemporary Approach to Housing Ourselves (2nd Edition), Ten Speed Press, 1994, .
Meltzer, Graham S.  "Sustainable Community: Learning from the Cohousing Model." Victoria, B.C.: Trafford Press, 2005, .
Williams, Jo. Designing neighbourhoods for social interaction: The case of cohousing'', " Journal of Urban Design," 2005, Vol.10, No. 2, 195–227.

External links

Communities Self-Identifying as "Uses Cohousing Model" in FIC's Communities Directory
CohoUS an association a community of communities, includes directory of US cohousing communities
Cohousing-L, mailing list about cohousing (45,000 messages 1993–2020).
Foundation for Intentional Community (FIC)

Media
 
 
 Grace Kim: How cohousing can make us happier (and live longer)

 
Living arrangements
Intentional living

Types of communities